L'Orange may refer to:

L'Orange GmbH, a German engineering manufacturing company 
"L'Orange" (song), a 1964 song by Gilbert Bécaud
L'Orange (record producer)
Hans Peter L'orange (officer) (1835–1907), a Norwegian military officer
Hans Peter L'Orange (academic) (1903–1983), a Norwegian art historian and archaeologist
Prosper L'Orange (1876–1939), a German engineer and inventor

See also

Lorange, a surname
Orange (disambiguation)
Duck à l'orange, a classic French food dish